The Ankara Metro is the rapid transit system serving Ankara, the capital of Turkey. At present, Ankara's rapid transit system consists of two metro lines – the Batıkent Metrosu (M1) and the new Keçiören Metrosu (M4) line opened in 2017, along with the light rail Ankaray line. The Ankaray, the M1 and M4 lines, together transported 104.1 million passengers in 2014.  That corresponds to a ridership of approximately 289,155 per day.
In February 2019 all the lines that used to run M1, M2 and M3 were merged to create one line, M1.

The Kızılay to Atatürk Cultural Center link of M4 is not yet opened and remains under construction. Also, an additional line (approx. 25 km long) between Kuyubaşı and Esenboğa International Airport is in the planning stages and would make up the next phase of expansion of the metro.

History

Ankaray

The Ankaray was constructed by a consortium headed by Siemens over a period of four years (1992–96). It opened on 20 August 1996. The line has 11 stations.

Ankara Metro

The Ankara Metro has been operating since 29 December 1997, with the opening of its first full metro line, M1, traveling between Kızılay, the city center, and Batıkent. The M2 line, operating from Kızılay, the city center, to Koru, opened 12 February 2014. The M3 line, which serves almost as an extension of the M1 line, operating from Batıkent to Törekent, opened a month later on 13 March 2014. For the first few years of operations on lines M2 and M3, both of them ran separately from the M1 line; since early 2019, the three lines are operated as one continuous service (M1) between Törekent and Koru.

The M4 line, operating from Atatürk Cultural Center to Gazino, opened on 5 January 2017.

In 2019 Turisk defense firm ASELSAN began traction and control upgrades on the older Bombardier cars.

Operations

Lines

The following table lists the five metro lines (including the Ankaray line) currently in service on the Ankara Metro:

Current stations

Ankaray (A1)
 Dikimevi
 Kurtuluş  (transfer to: Başkentray (suburban rail))
 Kolej
 15 Temmuz Kızılay Milli İrade  (transfer to: M1, M2, M4)
 Demirtepe
 Maltepe (transfer to: M4, Başkentray (suburban rail))
 Anadolu/Anıtkabir (formerly known as: Tandoğan)
 Beşevler
 Bahçelievler
 Emek
 AŞTİ
 Söğütözü (under construction) (transfer to: M2)

Batıkent Metrosu (M1)
 15 Temmuz Kızılay Milli İrade  (continues to: M2, transfer to: Ankaray, M4)
 Sıhhiye  (transfer to: Başkentray (suburban rail))
 Ulus
 Atatürk Kültür Merkezi (transfer to: M4)
 Akköprü
 İvedik
 Yenimahalle (transfer to: Yenimahalle–Şentepe cable car line)
 Demetevler
 Hastane
 Macunköy
 Ostim
 Batıkent  (continues to: M3)

Koru Metrosu (M2)
 15 Temmuz Kızılay Milli İrade  (continues to: M1, transfer to: Ankaray, M4)
 Necatibey
 Milli Kütüphane
 Söğütözü  (transfer to: Ankaray)
 Maden Tetkik ve Arama
 Orta Doğu Teknik Üniversitesi
 Bilkent
 Tarım Bakanlığı/Danıştay
 Beytepe
 Ümitköy
 Çayyolu
 Koru

Törekent Metrosu (M3)
 Batıkent  (continues to: M1)
 Batı Merkez
 Mesa
 Botanik
 İstanbul Yolu
 Eryaman 1-2
 Eryaman 5
 Devlet Mahallesi/1910 Ankaragücü
 Harikalar Diyarı
 Fatih
 GOP
 OSB-Törekent

Keçiören Metrosu (M4)
 15 Temmuz Kızılay Milli İrade (under construction) (transfer to: M1, M2, Ankaray)
 Adliye (under construction)
 TCDD Hızlı Tren Garı (under construction) (transfer to: Ankaray, Başkentray (suburban rail))
 Atatürk Kültür Merkezi (transfer to: M1)
 ASKİ
 Dışkapı
 Meteroloji
 Belediye
 Mecidiye 
 Kuyubaşı
 Dutluk
 Gazino (Şehitler)

Planned stations

Ankaray (A2)
 Dikimevi
 Abidinpaşa
 Aşık Veysel
 Tuzluçayır
 General Zeki Doğan
 Fahri Korutürk
 Cengizhan
 Akşemsettin
 Natoyolu

Rolling stock
The track width on both subway lines is 1435 mm (normal gauge).

Vehicles of the Canadian type Hawker H6 run on the M1. The trains in Ankara are a modification of the almost identical H6 trains that were used on the Toronto subway. The vehicles were manufactured by Bombardier until the early 1990s. The structure is made of riveted aluminum and has a gray color. There is an orange stripe around the windows. There are four entrances on each side of each car. In the three-car units, the first and third cars are railcars, the middle car has no separate drive.

The underground trains used on the Ankaray line were built by the Italian wagon manufacturer AnsaldoBreda in Naples in cooperation with Siemens. Only one of the three-car units has an engine (railcar), the other two cars are not driven (sidecar). The cars are white with orange applications around the windows.

The trains for the current lines and the new ones are built by CRRC in China. The new cars have many common features with old ones. Both cars have 4 entrances, and only the first and the third cars are railcars and the middle car is a sidecar in the three-car unit. Besides the old stock, the new stock has a separate space for the control panel, located at the front of the first and the third railcar.

Network map

Rolling stock

Ankaray

The system is served by 11 trainsets. Each trainset comprises 3 sets of 2 cars paired together. The current passenger volume capacity on the Ankaray line is 27,000 passengers per hour per direction (PPHPD).

Ankara Metro
The original vehicles used on the M1 line are Bombardier Transportation-built modified versions of the sixth-generation H-series trains used on the Toronto subway. The Toronto trains on which they were based on were built in 1986 by the Urban Transportation Development Corporation (UTDC), a company later purchased by Bombardier. There are a total of 108 of these cars, which are usually configured as 18 six-car trainsets. The car's seats are made of rigid plastic, and are all arranged longitudinally. There are no forward- or rear-facing seats, and no seats at the front or rear of each car.

In 2012, a large order of 324 subway cars from CRRC Zhuzhou was placed to supplement the fleet on line M1 and for use on the newer M2, M3 and M4 lines.

Signalling System 
Both Ankara Metro and Ankaray depend on Communications-based Train Control railway signalling system. In Ankaray, signals only show whenever is there a train or blockage exists or not. However, in Ankara Metro, signals only activated by automatic control by specific rules.
 
Unlike other subways, Ankara Metro does not use green signal on normal operations. Only one fixed chunk in front of the train will become available which results in yellow signals at normal operation even more than one chunk is available. The strict rule of flashing (or blinking) yellow signal depends on these two conditions that must be met at the same time: The Metro arriving at the station or present at the station must be in standard operation mode and at least one chunk towards to forward direction must be free. Also, flashing yellow signals are only emitted on forward signals, preventing reverse direction movement in normal operation mode. If one of these conditions are not met (except Operation Mode), the signal will emit red light. While train will out of standard operation mode, the signals will return normal Communitacions-based Train Control rules or manual signal control.
For green and yellow signals, there are 2 different variants; Flashing or static. Flashing signals means either automatic controlled route or manually set route in effect. Static signals are manually controlled or emitted from the control center, however.

Ankaray also uses red, yellow, and green signals. Red and green signals used for indicating is the chunk occupied or not. Unlike the Ankara metro, the yellow signal turns on when a rail change is going to be made.

Future Service 
Construction of the following metro lines are under construction or planned:

See also

 Başkentray Extending to the northwest after.

References

 Ankara metro construction resumes soon in:  February 2012

External links

 Ankaray – official website 
 Network map
 Ankara Metro at UrbanRail.net

 
Ankara
Underground rapid transit in Turkey
Railway lines opened in 1997
Standard gauge railways in Turkey
Yenimahalle, Ankara
750 V DC railway electrification
Transportation in Ankara